A number of late 3rd-century Christian works are pseudepigraphically attributed to Dorotheus of Tyre. These works describe the lives of the Apostles and their disciples, including tradition about Barnabas living in Rome.

References

External links
 "Apocryphal and then some: The so-called "Synopsis" of so-called Dorotheus of Tyre – Roger Pearse", May 8, 2017

Christian writers
New Testament apocrypha